The Volunteer of the Year is a national award in Estonia for volunteer work, established in 2005.

2008
On December 7, 2008 President of Estonia Toomas Hendrik Ilves presented the award to the following 15 people:
Peeter Kuudu
Monika Rusing
Tõnis Puss
Aado Kuhlap
Maaja Glaser
Liis Lill
Helju Kukk
Rainer Nõlvak – for organizing Let's Do It 2008
Uno Aan
Üllar Saaremäe – for organizing Estonian Punk Song Festival
Urve Uusberg
Aune Suve
Andres Luure – for his contributions to Estonian Wikipedia
Helo Meigas
Ahti Heinla – for organizing Let's Do It 2008

During the ceremony the rock group Terminaator played four of their songs: "Osa minust",  "Romula", "See ei ole saladus", and "Tahan ärgata üles".

References

Estonian awards
Volunteering
Awards established in 2005
2005 establishments in Estonia